The women's double trap competition at the 2004 Summer Olympics was held on August 18 at the Markópoulo Olympic Shooting Centre near Athens, Greece. This was the last Olympic competition in the event, before being removed from the program shortly after the Games.

The event consisted of two rounds: a qualifier and a final. In the qualifier, each shooter fired 3 sets of 40 in the set order of skeet shooting.

The top 6 shooters in the qualifying round moved on to the final round. There, they fired one additional round of 40. The total score from all 160 shots was used to determine final ranking. Ties are broken using a shoot-off; additional shots are fired one at a time until there is no longer a tie.

U.S. shooter and 1996 Olympic champion Kim Rhode rallied her way in the final rounds to reclaim the gold medal with a total record of 146. South Korea's Lee Bo-na narrowly missed a shot for the Olympic title by a single bird, but secured the silver with a score of 145, while Chinese shooter and four-time Olympian Gao E beat her teammate Li Qingnian in a 2 to 1 shoot-off to take the bronze at 142 hits.

Records
Prior to this competition, the existing world and Olympic records were as follows.

Qualification round 

Q Qualified for final

Final

References

External links
Official Results

Women's Double Trap
Olymp
Women's events at the 2004 Summer Olympics